Melbourne Street is a street in Northbridge, Western Australia that runs between Roe and James Streets. The current street is a part of an older and longer street that at one time extended from Murray Street to what is now Aberdeen Street. It is named after Lord Melbourne, the British prime minister in the 1830s, when the street was originally built.

History
Melbourne Street appears in maps of Perth from as early as 1838, running from Murray Street north to Lamb Street (now Aberdeen Street). By 1845 Russell Square had been constructed and Melbourne Street terminated at James Street. In 1923 Melbourne Road was renamed to Milligan Street and deemed an extension of the existing street of that name when the Perth City Council adopted a committee recommendation: However the name Melbourne Road continued to be used at least until the 1940s.

Melbourne Street was originally continuous between Murray and James Streets but it was closed between Wellington and Roe Streets in 1911. The road was removed in 1974, when the Perth Entertainment Centre was built.

In December 2017 the City of Perth Council agreed to a request from Landgate and the portion of Milligan Street between Roe and James Streets was renamed back to Melbourne Street.

Intersections

Notes

References

Streets in Northbridge, Western Australia